Michael Nees (born 23 July 1967) is a German professional football coach and former player who last worked as manager of the Kosovo national under-21 team.

Administrative career

Kosovo
At the end of January 2017, Nees start working as technical director in Football Federation of Kosovo and came with the recommendation and funding of the German Football Association, he would deal with all the technical work of Kosovo national teams starting from national youth teams to national senior team.

Managerial career

Seychelles
On 14 February 2003, Seychelles signed with Ness after the former coach Dominique Bathenay before a year ago decided to resign.

References

External links

1967 births
Living people
Footballers from Karlsruhe
German footballers
Association footballers not categorized by position
German football managers
Seychelles national football team managers
Expatriate football managers in Seychelles
Rwanda national football team managers
Expatriate football managers in Rwanda